Syria-Venezuela relations are bilateral relations between the Syrian Arab Republic and the Bolivarian Republic of Venezuela. Diplomatic relations were established on 17 June 1946. and have been characterized by friendship and cooperation. Syria has an embassy in Caracas and Venezuela has an embassy in Damascus.

History 
Both countries have supported each other in the face of international pressure against their respective national policies. In August 2006, President Hugo Chávez of Venezuela made his first official visit to Syria to show his support for the county in the face of rising tensions with United States. Chávez also made visits to Syria in September 2009 and October 2010, while Syrian president Bashar al-Assad met with Chávez in Venezuela in July 2010.

Venezuela continued to support the Assad regime throughout the Syrian civil war, first under Chávez and later under the leadership of Nicolás Maduro.

On 29 July 2019, Syria was one of the countries to sign a joint declaration in support of the Maduro government, as part of a letter addressed to UN Secretary General António Guterres in response to the Venezuelan presidential crisis.

See also
 Syrian Venezuelans
 Foreign relations of Syria
 Foreign relations of Venezuela

References

 
Venezuela
Bilateral relations of Venezuela